Jean-Michel Péquery (born May 30, 1978) is a retired French professional tennis player. During his career, he competed exclusively in Challengers and Futures tournaments, except for two showings (for two first-round losses) in the doubles main draw of ATP Tour-level tournaments. One of these was to remain his sole appearance at a Grand Slam and came at the 1998 French Open when he alongside Julien Boutter received a wild card to compete in the doubles tournament. They fell to Jim Grabb and David Macpherson 6–3, 7–6.

Challengers and Futures finals

Singles: 15 (9–6)

Doubles: 21 (13–8)

References

External links
 

1978 births
Living people
French male tennis players
Sportspeople from Mulhouse